Right Bokka Left - Nadutu Kudonji is a Tulu language film directed by Yelnad Yatish Alva starring Sandeep Shetty, Prasanna Shetty Bailoor  in lead roles and  Tonse Vijay Kumar Shetty, Kumbra Dayakar Alva, Chaya Harsha, Namita Sharan, Mohair Shetty, Mervin are the remaining actors. Right Bokka Left is produced under the banner of  Sri Mangalambika Productions by Yelnad Yatish Alva,  &  K Chandrashekar Rai Akshay Puttur.

Plot
The movie is about how a helpless person is helped by his friends and finally becomes an industrialist.

Cast
 Sandeep Shetty
 Prasanna Shetty Bailoor 
 Tonse Vijay Kumar Shetty
 Kumbra Dayakar Alv
 Chaya Harsha
 Namita Sharan
 Mohair Shetty
 Mervin

Soundtrack
The soundtracks of the film were composed by Dr Nitin Acharya. penned by director M.Yathish Kumar Alva.Released by Muzik247 Tulu

List of Tulu Movies Links
List of tulu films of 2015
List of Tulu films of 2014
List of Released Tulu films
Tulu cinema
 Tulu Movie Actors
 Tulu Movie Actresses

References

2015 films